The Glauco class was a pair of submarines ordered by the Portuguese government, but were taken over and completed for the  (Royal Italian Navy) during the 1930s. They played a minor role in the Spanish Civil War of 1936–1939 supporting the Spanish Nationalists.

Design and description
The Glauco-class submarines were improved versions of the preceding . They displaced  surfaced and  submerged.

For surface running, the boats were powered by two  diesel engines, each driving one propeller shaft. When submerged each propeller was driven by a  electric motor. They could reach  on the surface and  underwater.

The boats were armed with eight internal  torpedo tubes, four each in the bow and stern. They carried a total of 14 torpedoes. They were also armed with two  deck guns, one each fore and aft of the conning tower, for combat on the surface. Their anti-aircraft armament consisted of one or two  machine guns.

Ships

Service
Both boats were built by CRDA in its Trieste shipyard. The submarines had initially been ordered in 1931, but were acquired by the Italians when Portugal cancelled the order. Both boats were launched in 1935, and they saw action in the Spanish Civil War and the Second World War. Glauco was badly damaged by the British destroyer HMS Wishart and scuttled by her own crew on 27 June 1941, west of Gibraltar; Otaria was surrendered to the Allies in 1943 and used for training until it was sent to the junkyard in 1948.

Notes

References

External links
 Glauco-class submarine Marina Militare website

Submarine classes
 
 Glauco
Ships built in Italy